Hotta Masayasu may refer to:

Hotta Masayasu (1655-1731), daimyō of Ōmi-Miyagawa Domain 1698-1715
Hotta Masayasu (Viscount), daimyō of Ōmi-Miyagawa Domain 1863-1871; subsequently Minister of Communications in 1908

See also
Hotta clan